D Generation is a glam punk band from New York City.

D Generation may also refer to:

The D-Generation, an Australian sketch comedy show
D/Generation, a 1991 video game
D-Generation X a wrestling stable
D Generation (album), the self-titled debut album by D Generation